USS Lakewood Victory (AK-236) was a  acquired by the U.S. Navy during World War II.  She served in the Pacific Ocean theatre of operations through the end of the war, earning two  battle stars, and then returned to the United States for disposal.

Victory built in California
Lakewood Victory (AK-236) was laid down 16 September 1944, by Permanente Metals Corporation, Richmond, California, under a U.S. Maritime Commission contract; launched 17 November; sponsored by Mrs. Edward A. Fitzgerald; and commissioned 11 December.

World War II operations
After shakedown, Lakewood Victory departed San Francisco, California, 18 January 1945 loaded with a cargo of ammunition, booms, and aircraft. Steaming via Pearl Harbor and Eniwetok, she reached the Mariana Islands in convoy 19 February and supplied combat ships with shells and powder.

Departing Saipan the 26th, she headed for Iwo Jima with Task Group 50.8. While the battle for Iwo Jima raged, she arrived the 28th and began supplying cruisers, destroyers, and landing craft with ammunition. She continued discharging her cargo until 8 March; then she sailed for the western Caroline Islands, arriving Ulithi the 11th.
 
On 3 April Lakewood Victory cleared Ulithi for logistics support operations off Okinawa. After reaching Kerama Retto 13 April, she supplied waiting destroyers, LSTs, and smaller landing craft with explosive cargo. She was the target of multiple Japanese Zero kamikaze attacks which war thwarted when American Destroyers and Battleships shot them out of the sky before they reached their targets. Her crew worked under cover of protective smoke to transfer ammunition before sailing 23 April for Ulithi, where she arrived the 28th.
 
Lakewood Victory sailed 20 May for the New Hebrides. Steaming via Manus, Admiralty Islands, she reached Espiritu Santo 28 May; loaded ammunition and fog oil; and departed 19 June for Leyte. She arrived San Pedro Bay the 28th and operated off Leyte for more than 2 months. After the Japanese surrender, she returned to the United States via the Mariana Islands and Pearl Harbor, arriving Puget Sound, Washington, 8 October.
 
After unloading her cargo, she sailed for the western Pacific Ocean 18 November. From 6 December to 2 March 1946 she loaded ammunition at Guam and Saipan.

Post-war decommissioning and career
Returning to San Francisco 15 March, Lakewood Victory decommissioned 16 May and was turned over to the War Shipping Administration (WSA). Final disposition, sold for scrapping, 9 August 1993, to California Import Export Inc., for $368,512, removed from the Reserve Fleet anchorage, 25 September 1993.

Honors and awards
Lakewood Victory received two battle stars for World War II service. Lakewood Victoryalso earned the American Campaign Medal, Asiatic-Pacific Campaign Medal, World War II Victory Medal and the Philippines Liberation Medal.

References

 
 NavSource Online: Service Ship Photo Archive - AK-236 Lakewood Victory

 

Boulder Victory-class cargo ships
Ships built in Richmond, California
1944 ships
Ammunition ships of the United States Navy
World War II auxiliary ships of the United States
James River Reserve Fleet
Hudson River Reserve Fleet
Suisun Bay Reserve Fleet